Sandung or sandong is the ossuary of the Katingan, Ngaju and Pesaguan people native to the southern and central Kalimantan in Indonesia. The sandung is an integral part of the  ceremony of the Ngaju people, which is basically a secondary burial ritual where the bones of the deceased are taken from the cemeteries, purified and finally placed in a sandung.

Form and types

The sandung is a wooden ossuary shaped like a small house, with ornate roofs, windows, doors, and miniature stairs. Ideally a sandung is made of ironwood, although today lighter wood of any kind of trees can also be used. The house-shaped ossuary will actually be brought by the deceased to the paradise to become their house. Sandungs are painted in bright colors and decorated with carvings representing various religious symbols and patterns. The base of the sandung container is usually decorated with foliage pattern representing the mythical tree of life. Figures of man and woman painted on both side of the miniature door is said to represent a couple which would marry and produce children who will assist their parents in guarding the repository. Other figures painted on the walls of the sandung represents different Ngaju deities from the Kaharingan folk religion. Painting or carving of moon and stars is painted on the downriver side of the sandung, while painting of the sun is depicted on the upriver side; these astronomical landmarks are related with the journey that must be passed by the souls on their way to the Kaharingan paradise, the Lewa Liau. The roof of a sandung is usually decorated with a type of wild chicken. This bird, known as the piak liau, will become a possession for the deceased in the afterlife.

Some sandung are built to contain the bones of a single individual, while others for fifty or more persons. In general, the Dayak people of the Kahayan region prefers large sandung capable of storing remains of many kin, assuring that they will form another household in the afterlife. The Dayak of the Katingan region prefer smaller sandung. A sandung for an individual person (sandung tunggal, "single sandung") is usually build for persons who had died a "bad" or unnatural death, or other reasons which deemed the person remains is inappropriate to be interred with the bones of other family members.

A sandung is normally set high above poles, although there are some sandung that is simply placed on ground (known as sandung munduk). Some sandung reach the height of  while others at the height of only . The poles supporting the sandung are often carved with ferocious faces, bulging eyes and protruding tongues. This figure represents the animate essence of the sandung (ganan sandung) which protects the inhabitant of the sandung from potential threats.

There are many varieties and shapes of sandung, among those discovered in the villages of Ngaju people along the Kahayan River include:
Sandung buwuk, a sandung made from a tree trunk and carved with a single opening. This type of sandung is very uncommon.
Sandung tunggal, a sandung which stands on a single pole.
Kariring or sandung kariring is a long sandung supported by two poles.
Sandung keratun is a sandung supported on four poles.
Sandung samburup is a Chinese jar in a small, open-sided hut. An uncommon type of sandung.
Sandung munduk is a sandung built directly on the ground.
Sandung tingang is a brass container placed in an open-sided hut with a roof carved to resemble a hornbill.
Pambak resembles a stone or wooden crypt. Pambak is not buried, and sometimes valuables are placed in the crypt.

Unlike graves which is usually located some distance downriver away from the village, sandungs are located in the center of villages. Some sandungs are hundreds years old. A collection of sandungs are kept in the Balanga Museum, Palangkaraya.

festival
The sandung is an integral part of the  dead festival. The  is the most important festival of the Ngaju people, where the soul of the dead is ensured safe journey to paradise. During the  ceremony, the bones of the dead are dug from the cemetery and carried back to the village. The bones will be purified, cleaned and anointed with oil and gold dust by their closest kin e.g. their children or their grandchildren. After the purification, the bones are carefully wrapped in cloth and placed in the sandung.

Modernity
Since the mid-1960s, the increasing availability of cements means that cement ossuaries are becoming more popular. These are usually of sandung munduk type, the type of sandung which stands on ground. Fragments of tile and mirror are pressed into the drying cement to decorate it. As more Dayak people adopt Christianity or Islam, sandung is becoming more rare, but still can seen in few place of Central Borneo/Kalimantan. Many ancient sandung and sapundu (mortuary pole) are stolen because of its historic value.

References

Cited works

Death customs
Ngaju people
Religion in Indonesia